M12, aka M12 STUDIO, is an American artist collective and non-profit organization based in Colorado that features an evolving group of artist practitioners, curators, and designers.  Together they create artworks, research projects, and education programs that explore rural cultures and landscapes.  Initially formed as the municipalWORKSHOP in 2002 in York, Alabama by Richard Saxton when he was an artist-in-residence at the Rural Studio, an architecture studio run by Auburn University, the group evolved into M12 in 2007 when it became incorporated as a non-profit organization.  The core members have created over 20 projects since founding; their work was featured in the 2014 publication "A Decade of Country Hits: Art on the Rural Frontier."

History
municipalWORKSHOP (2002-2007)

The municipalWORKSHOP was created in 2002 by Richard Saxton based on an effort to bring a "rural renaissance" to the small town of York, Alabama.  This art laboratory aimed to work with municipalities and communities to develop more creative approaches to living in rural America.  The organization's first project was called Utility Now!, a series of pedal-powered street-sweepers and utility tricycles and bicycles for city crews to better maintain York.

From 2002 to 2007, the municipalWORKSHOP created public art projects with local communities throughout the United States. Projects range from a Music Integrated Kiosk Environment (M.I.K.E.) produced for the John Michael Kohler Arts Center in Sheboygan, Wisconsin to the AutoTour Vehicle built for the Center for Land Use Interpretation in Wendover, Utah. In 2007, the collective formalized as M12, and expanded its reach to communities in Europe, South America, and Australia.
 
2007–present

M12 has exhibited at the 13th International Venice Architecture Biennale, The Kalmar Konstmuseum in Sweden, The Chicago Cultural Center, Franklin Street Works, Wormfarm Institute, The 2011 Australian Biennial (SPACED), The 2010 Biennial of the Americas, The Center for Land Use Interpretation, The Ewing Gallery of Art and Architecture at the University of Tennessee, The John Michael Kohler Arts Center, The Contemporary Museum in Baltimore, Wall House #2 in the Netherlands, and The Irish Museum of Modern Art in Dublin. The group now develops projects worldwide and operates out of a renovated feed store in Byers, Colorado and maintains a 40-acre site in Last Chance, Colorado.

Projects
 Campito, which re-imagined the sheepherders wagon, initially commissioned by the Biennial of the Americas and subsequently featured in the Spontaneous Interventions exhibition in the U.S. Pavilion of the 13th International Venice Biennale of Architecture.
 Prairie Modules, an ongoing series of architectural sculptures that were first installed on the Indianapolis Cultural Trail in Indianapolis, Indiana. Subsequent modules are situated at the Wormfarm Institute in Reedsburg, Wisconsin and The Experimental Site in Last Chance, Colorado.
  Ornitarium, a bird observatory and social space constructed in Denmark, Australia, created as part of the International Art Space Kellerberrin Australia 2011 site-based Biennial.
 Black Hornet, a four-year project with the Hall family racing team that started in 2010 in Fort Morgan, Colorado and featured in the exhibition "The Black Hornet" at the Galleries of Contemporary Art in Ft. Collins, Colorado.
 Action on the Plains, a NEA-funded artist in residence program that invites artists, writers, and researchers to collaborate with M12 in response to the rural Colorado landscape.

References

External links 
 
 Decade of Country Hits; Art on the Rural Frontier

American artist groups and collectives
Architecture groups
Arts organizations based in Colorado
Arts organizations established in 2007